"Jabberwocky" is an 1872 nonsense poem by Lewis Carroll, about an encounter between a young boy and a monster called the Jabberwock.

Jabberwocky or Jabberwock may also refer to:

Books 

 Jabberwocky (book), 2004 book by Lewis Carroll and Stéphane Jorisch

Films and television
 Jabberwocky (film), 1977 film directed by Terry Gilliam
 Jabberwocky (1971 film), directed by Jan Švankmajer
 Jabberwocky (TV series) (1972–1974), American children's television series
 "Jabberwocky" (Better Off Ted), an episode of the TV series Better Off Ted
 Jabberwock, 2010 television movie directed by Steven R. Monroe

Games
 Jabberwocky, a character in the 2000 computer game American McGee's Alice
 Jabberwock Island, the setting of the video game Danganronpa 2: Goodbye Despair

Music 
 The Jabberwock (club), a nightclub in Berkeley, California, U.S.
 Jabberwocks, a cappella group at Brown University, Providence, Rhode Island, U.S.
 Jabberwocky (album), by Clive Nolan and Oliver Wakeman
 Jabberwocky (band), French electro-pop band
 Jabberwocky (musical), by Andrew Kay, Malcolm Middleton and Peter Phillips
 Jabberwocky, an unreleased Jani Lane album

Publications
 Jabberwock (magazine), published in London by Chapman & Hall and edited by Brenda Girvin
 Jabberwock Review, a literary journal
 The Jabberwock, the student newspaper of Boston Latin Academy

Software
 Jabberwacky, a chatbot created by Rollo Carpenter, winner of the 2005 and 2006 Loebner prizes
 Jabberwock, a chatbot created by Juergen Pirner, winner of the 2003 Loebner Prize

Other media and entertainment
 Jabbawockeez, a dance group
 Jabberwock (play), a 1972 play by Jerome Lawrence and Robert Edwin Lee

Other uses
 7470 Jabberwock, a minor planet
 Jabberwocky Graphix, media company owned by American artist Brad W. Foster

See also
 Jabberwocky sentence, a type of sentence of interest in neurolinguistics
 "Mimsy Were the Borogoves", 1943 science fiction story by Lewis Padgett
 Beamish (disambiguation)
 Wabe (disambiguation)
 Vorpal (disambiguation)
 Tumtum (disambiguation)